Big Ticket may refer to:
Big Ticket Entertainment, a production company
Big Ticket (game show), a game show in the United Kingdom
Kevin Garnett (born 1976), an American former basketball player.

See also
Big ticket item, an item that has high price compared to other items in a store